Silvio Brivio (6 November 1929 – 3 November 2010) was an Italian gymnast. He competed in eight events at the 1952 Summer Olympics.

References

External links
 

1929 births
2010 deaths
Italian male artistic gymnasts
Olympic gymnasts of Italy
Gymnasts at the 1952 Summer Olympics
Sportspeople from Como